One Punk Under God is a 2006 original observational documentary that aired on the Sundance Channel, directed and produced by Jeremy Simmons.  It focused on the life of Jay Bakker, only son of Jim Bakker and Tammy Faye Messner (formerly Bakker), formerly evangelical ministers and hosts of The PTL Club.  The documentary is a six-part series of half-hour episodes.

References

External links 
 One Punk Under God at the Sundance Channel
 

2000s American documentary television series
2006 American television series debuts
2007 American television series endings
Television shows set in Atlanta
Christianity in Georgia (U.S. state)
Television shows set in New York (state)
Culture of New York City
Christianity in New York City
Television series by World of Wonder (company)